Maram, or Maharam, is an Austroasiatic language of Meghalaya, India. It's closely related to Khasi, and is sometimes considered a dialect of that language, though it appears to be more divergent than Khasi is from Pnar.

References

Khasian languages
Languages of India
Languages of Meghalaya